The following is a list of expected and scheduled events for the year 2023 in New Zealand.

Incumbents

Regal and vice-regal

Head of State – Charles III
Governor-General – Cindy Kiro

Government
Legislature term: 53rd New Zealand Parliament

The Sixth Labour Government, elected in 2020, continues.

Speaker of the House – Adrian Rurawhe
Prime Minister – Jacinda Ardern until 25 January, then Chris Hipkins
Deputy Prime Minister – Grant Robertson until 25 January, then Carmel Sepuloni
Leader of the House – Chris Hipkins until 25 January, then Grant Robertson
Minister of Finance – Grant Robertson
Minister of Foreign Affairs – Nanaia Mahuta

Other party leaders in parliament
 National – Christopher Luxon (Leader of the Opposition)
 Green  –  James Shaw and Marama Davidson
 ACT – David Seymour
 Te Pāti Māori – Rawiri Waititi and Debbie Ngarewa-Packer

Judiciary
Chief Justice – Helen Winkelmann

Main centre leaders
Mayor of Auckland – Wayne Brown
Mayor of Tauranga – Anne Tolley (as chair of commissioners)
Mayor of Hamilton – Paula Southgate
Mayor of Wellington – Tory Whanau
Mayor of Christchurch – Phil Mauger
Mayor of Dunedin – Jules Radich

Events

January 
 4 January – Severe weather hits Coromandel and the upper North Island bringing thunderstorms and torrential rain. Holidaymakers are forced to evacuate and continuing severe weather causes numerous landslips.
 9 January – COVID-19 in New Zealand: The "Kraken" subvariant of Omicron is detected in New Zealand for the first time after genome sequencing of two cases. Health officials are confident the current COVID-19 response is appropriate.
 10 January – Cyclone Hale impacts the North Island, causing flooding and slips in Coromandel and Gisborne.
 18 January – A Qantas flight travelling from Auckland to Sydney lands safely after issuing a mayday call.
 19 January 
 Jacinda Ardern announces her pending resignation as prime minister and Labour Party leader.
A wild kiwi egg is laid in Wellington for the first time in more than 100 years.
 22 January – Chris Hipkins is unanimously elected leader of the Labour Party.
 25 January – Chris Hipkins and Carmel Sepuloni are sworn in as Prime Minister and Deputy Prime Minister, respectively, at Government House, Wellington. 
 27 January – Torrential rain in Auckland causes widespread flooding, slips, evacuations, and the deaths of four people (from Cyclone Hale).

February 
 1 February – A second wave of severe weather and torrential rain hits Auckland, worsening the already catastrophic flooding.
 5 February – Auckland begins a series of significant large-scale clean up operations in the aftermath of catastrophic flooding. Authorities believe the city is now out of danger.
 8 February – Police Commissioner Andrew Coster announced the seizure of 3.2 tonnes of cocaine floating in the Pacific that was probably destined for Australia, an amount that represents 30 years of consumption in New Zealand.
 12 February – Cyclone Gabrielle: Thousands of people are left without power as Cyclone Gabrielle makes landfall over the North Island. The regions of Northland and Auckland are put under a state of emergency.
 14 February
 Cyclone Gabrielle: A national state of emergency is declared as Cyclone Gabrielle continues to impact the North Island bringing extreme weather, flooding and land slides. A national state of emergency will allow the Government to step in and handle the emergency response.
 The ngaro huruhuru (native bee) is named the inaugural New Zealand Bug of the Year.
15 February
Anne, Princess Royal and Vice Admiral Sir Timothy Laurence arrive in Wellington for their tour of New Zealand. The pair’s planned military duties in Palmerston North were postponed. Instead, they will travel to the National Crisis Management Centre at the Beehive to meet with staff from agencies involved in the cyclone response. They will conduct the Service of Remembrance at the National War Memorial and pay respects at the United Kingdom memorial.
Shaking lasted a minute, with it being felt nationwide.
16 February – Cyclone Gabrielle: New Zealand starts accepting offers of international assistance.

March 
3 March – Large climate protests take place across the country as thousands march to demand immediate climate action from the government. The protesters make a number of demands and briefly stage a "sit in" at Christchurch City Council. 
 7 March – The 2023 census takes place.
 16 March – New Zealand enacted a ban of TikTok on devices connected to parliament citing cybersecurity concerns.

Predicted and scheduled events 
 6 May – The coronation of Charles III will take place in London.
 18 May – The 2023 budget will be delivered.
 5 June – The 2023 King's Birthday Honours will be announced.
 14 October – The 2023 general election will take place.
 30 December – The 2024 New Year Honours will be announced.

Holidays and observances 
Public holidays in New Zealand in 2023 are as follows:

 1 January – New Year's Day
 2 January – Day after New Year's Day
 3 January – New Year's Day observed
 6 February – Waitangi Day
 7 April – Good Friday
 10 April – Easter Monday
 25 April – Anzac Day
 5 June – King's Birthday
 14 July – Matariki
 23 October – Labour Day
 25 December – Christmas Day
 26 December – Boxing Day

Sport

Association football
20 July – 20 August: 2023 FIFA Women's World Cup

Horse racing

Thoroughbred racing
 Wellington Cup – Leaderboard

Sailing 

 15 January – The New Zealand SailGP team win the Singapore SailGP event, giving them their third event win of the 2022–2023 season

Shooting
 Ballinger Belt – John Snowden (Ashburton)

Tennis 
 2–14 January – The WTA Auckland Open and ATP Auckland Open (collectively known as the ASB Classic) are held for the first time since 2020, after two years of cancellations related to the COVID-19 pandemic.

Deaths

January
 2 January – Frank Cameron, cricket player (Otago, national team) and national cricket selector (born 1932).
 3 January – Jeremy Salmond, heritage architect (Auckland Synagogue, Pompallier House), NZIA Gold Medal (2018) (born 1944).
 6 January
 Sir Patrick Hogan, Hall of Fame racehorse breeder, founder of Cambridge Stud (born 1939).
 Stuart McCutcheon, university administrator, vice-chancellor of the University of Auckland (2005–2020) and Victoria University of Wellington (2000–2004) (born 1954).
 10 January – Bruce Murray, cricketer (Wellington, national team), cricket administrator, historian, and schoolteacher, principal of Naenae College (1981–1989) and Tawa College (1989–2002) (born 1940).
 11 January – Jim Howland, local politician, mayor of Putāruru (1974–1989), Waikato District Councillor (1989–2007) (born 1929).
 13 January – Bob Stott, railway industry commentator and writer, editor and owner of Rails magazine (born 1940).
 15 January – Ewing Stevens, Presbyterian minister, writer, newspaper editor and radio talkback host (Radio Pacific, Radio Live) (born 1926).
 16 January – Geoff Harrow, mountaineer and environmentalist, first ascent of Baruntse (1954), rediscovered Hutton's shearwater breeding colonies (1964) (born 1926).
 17 January – Larry Morris, Hall of Fame singer (Larry's Rebels) (born 1947).
 20 January
 Chris Leitch, politician, leader of the Social Credit Party (since 2018) (born ).
 Rodney Macann, operatic bass-baritone and Baptist minister (born 1942).
 22 January – Bob Jackson, Hall of Fame croquet player, world doubles champion (1989) and world singles bronze medallist (1993), and table tennis player (born 1931).
 25 January – Titewhai Harawira, Māori activist (Ngāti Hau, Ngāti Wai, Ngāti Hine) (born 1932).
 26 January
 Matthew During, neuroscientist, number 72 of New Zealand's Top 100 History Makers (2005) (born 1956).
 Keith Thomson, Olympic field hockey player (1968), and cricketer (Canterbury, national team) (born 1941).
 29 January – Ross Gillespie, Olympic field hockey player (1960, 1964) and coach (1972, 1976) (born 1935).

February
 4 February – Rob Williams, army general, Chief of the General Staff (1981–1984) (born 1930).
 5 February – Hilary Alexander, fashion journalist (The Daily Telegraph), British Fashion journalist of the year (1997, 2003) (born 1946).
 7 February – John Harré, social anthropologist (born 1931).
 8 February – George Preddey, atmospheric physicist (born 1941).
 10 February – Nancy Tichborne, watercolour artist and gardener (born 1942).
 12 February – Dennis McGrath, teacher and academic administrator, principal of Auckland College of Education (1985–2001) (born 1940).
 14 February – John Prince, Hall of Fame croquet player, first player to complete a sextuple peel in competition (born 1945).
 18 February – Peter Wolfenden, Hall of Fame harness-racing driver and trainer (Cardigan Bay) (born 1935).
 20 February – Jim Savage, shot putter, archer and table tennis player, Paralympic bronze medallist (1972, 1976) (born 1936).
 23 February – Alice Wylie, local politician and community leader, Mount Albert borough and city councillor (1962–1989) and deputy mayor (1983–1989) (born ).
 26 February – Ans Westra, photographer (Washday at the Pa), Arts Foundation of New Zealand Icon (since 2007) (born 1936).
 27 February
 Chester Borrows, police officer, politician and lawyer, MP for Whanganui (2005–2017), Minister for Courts (2011–2014), Deputy Speaker of the House of Representatives (2014–2017) (born 1957).
 Paul East, lawyer, politician and diplomat, MP for Rotorua (1978–1996), National list MP (1996–1999), Attorney-General (1990–1997), Minister of Defence (1996–1997), High Commissioner to the United Kingdom (1999–2002), King's Counsel (since 1995), Privy Counsellor (since 1998) (born 1946).
 28 February – Grant Turner, association footballer (Gisborne City, national team) (born 1958).

March
 2 March – Frank Dickson, banker, chief executive of the Canterbury Savings Bank (1963–1988) (born 1931).
 6 March – Georgina Beyer, politician, world's first openly transgender mayor and member of parliament, Mayor of Carterton (1995–2000), MP for Wairarapa (1999–2005), Labour list MP (2005–2007) (born 1957).
 7 March – Grant Bridger, actor (Merry Christmas, Mr. Lawrence, Gloss), singer and radio presenter (born 1947).
 13 March – John Wignall, bridge player and administrator (born 1932).
 14 March – Russ Hoggard, athletics coach (Beverly Weigel, Dave Norris, Portia Bing) (born ).
 17 March – Mary Ronnie, librarian and writer, National Librarian (1976–1981) (born 1926).
 19 March – Ralph Roberts, Olympic sailor (1960, 1968) and sports administrator, president of Yachting New Zealand (1986–1989), Olympic team chef de mission (1992) (born 1935).

References

 
Years in New Zealand
Years of the 21st century in New Zealand
2020s in New Zealand
New Zealand
New Zealand